Joseph John Sowerbutts (born 1988) is a British actor, who is known for playing the part of Thomas Mortmain in the 2003 film I Capture the Castle and for voicing Harry Potter in Harry Potter and the Philosopher's Stone video game.

Early life
He was born Joseph John Sowerbutts in London, England in 1988, to Julia and Kevin Sowerbutts.

Career
Sowerbutts made his professional acting debut as Miles in the 1999 television film The Turn of the Screw. He would later star in several other television series such as Harry Morant in The Inspector Lynley Mysteries Alex Maclean in Doctors.

He would later star in the 2003 film, I Capture the Castle as the character Thomas.

His other television film credits include Young Sexton film in Goodbye, Mr. Chips, Russel in The Lost Prince and Harry Bowden in Doc Martin and the Legend of the Cloutie. He also had a recurring role as Neal in the 2016 film Ghost Nets and had several small parts in various television shows, such as The Lost Prince and Casualty.

Sowerbutts also provided the voice of Harry Potter, Draco Malfoy, Vincent Crabbe and Gregory Goyle in the Harry Potter and the Philosopher's Stone video game.

It has been rumored that in the 2001 film Harry Potter and the Philosopher's Stone, Sowerbutts voice dubbed several of Daniel Radcliffe's lines in a few scenes of the film after Radcliffe's voice began to break. A spokesperson from Warner Bros. Studios however, denied this claim.

Recently, he starred as Matt in the cinematic interactive movie video game Late Shift.

Filmography

Film

Television

Video games

References

External links

1988 births
Living people
English male film actors
English male voice actors
English male child actors
English male video game actors
Male actors from London